Eric Graveline (born 29 July 1966) is a Canadian windsurfer. He competed in the Windglider event at the 1984 Summer Olympics.

References

External links
 
 

1966 births
Living people
Canadian windsurfers
Canadian male sailors (sport)
Olympic sailors of Canada
Sailors at the 1984 Summer Olympics – Windglider
Sportspeople from Quebec